Sremski Karlovci City Hall is located at the center of Sremski Karlovci, Serbia. City hall was built in the period between 1808 and 1811 in the neoclassicism style. It was constructed to be garrison of the nearby  Petrovaradin fortress in Novi Sad, and later it became a military building. Above the balcony is a coat of arms of Sremski Karlovci.

History 
The most important event that occurred in this building is declaration of Serbian Vojvodina from a balcony by Josif Rajačić in May 1848, known in Serbia as May Assembly, during European Revolutions of 1848. In this building the temporary government of Serbian Vojvodina was organized and was called The Main National Council. The first capital of Serbian Vojvodina was in Sremski Karlovci, so city hall was also the Serbian Vojvodina main government building.

Now in City hall is administration, including town council and police.

See also
Buildings and structures in Sremski Karlovci
List of places in Serbia

External links 

 Sremski Karlovci government

Government buildings completed in 1811
Sremski Karlovci
Buildings and structures in Sremski Karlovci
Office buildings in Serbia
City and town halls in Serbia